Rémi Thirion (born 23 April 1990) is a French downhill mountain biker. In 2020, he finished third in the UCI Downhill World Championships in Leogang, Austria.

Major results
2008
 1st  European Junior Downhill Championships
2009
 3rd  European Downhill Championships
2013
 1st Vallnord, UCI Downhill World Cup
2020
 3rd  Downhill, UCI Mountain Bike World Championships

References

Living people
Downhill mountain bikers
1990 births
French male cyclists
French mountain bikers
People from Saint-Dié-des-Vosges
Sportspeople from Vosges (department)
Cyclists from Grand Est